Ocean Reef Club Airport  is a private-use airport located  northeast of the central business district of the island of Key Largo in Monroe County, Florida, United States. The airport is privately owned.

Historical airline service

The airport had scheduled passenger airline service starting in 1971 operated by Ocean Reef Airways, a division of Montauk Caribbean Airlines. The airline provided on demand service to Miami International Airport and Fort Lauderdale–Hollywood International Airport along with charter service. The airline was owned and operated by Bob King and his spouse, who were homeowners in the Ocean Reef Club. The club provided special permission to use their trademarked name as part of their airline name. The service was so successful that they expanded in 1979, continuing their nonstop flights to and from Miami International Airport with a de Havilland Canada DHC-6 Twin Otter twin engine commuter turboprop.

References

External links
 Ocean Reef Club Airport

Airports in Monroe County, Florida
Privately owned airports